Juventud La Rural is a Peruvian football club, playing in the city of Surco, Lima, Peru.

The club is the biggest of Surco city, and one of the biggest in Lima Province.

The club were founded 1946 and play in the Copa Perú which is the third division of the Peruvian league.

History
In the 2009 Copa Perú, the club classified to the National Stage, but was eliminated by Tecnológico of Pucallpa.

Honours
Región IV: 0
 Runner-up (1): 2009

Liga Departamental de Lima: 1
Winners (1): 2009

Liga Provincial de Lima: 0
 Runner-up (1): 2009

Liga Distrital de Surco: 3
Winners (3): 1997, 1999, 2009

See also
List of football clubs in Peru
Peruvian football league system

External links
 Official Web
 Los 16 expedientes
 La vida Rural

Football clubs in Peru
Association football clubs established in 1946
1946 establishments in Peru